Major Vang Sue (Su, Seu) (also transliterated as Vaj Xwm) (January 30, 1945 – October 18, 1972) was a Laotian Hmong fighter pilot. Recipient of the USAF Distinguished Flying Cross. He flew over 4,000 combat missions as a T-28 bomber pilot. Vang trained briefly with Hmong fighter ace Lee Lue before Lee was shot down and became General Vang Pao's preeminent pilot after Lee's death. He frequently flew 15 days consecutively, and often as much as 15 sorties in a day. Renowned for his daring and bombing accuracy, Vang was shot down by anti-aircraft guns and killed in October 18, 1972.

Biography
Vang Sue was born on 30 January 1945, in Xieng Khouang, Laos to KiaPao Vang (father) and Ying Xiong (mother). He married  a school teacher, May A. Yang, in 1967 and together they had four children. Vang Sue joined the Royal Lao Air Force He ranks as Wing Leader.

See also
Air America (airline)
Air America (film)
Battle of Lima Site 85
History of Laos since 1945
Laos Memorial
Laotian Civil War also known as the "Secret War"
North Vietnamese invasion of Laos
Franco-Thai War

Further reading
Air America by Christopher Robbins
The Ravens, Pilots of the Secret War in Laos by Christopher Robbins

References

Hmong people
Laotian anti-communists
People of the Laotian Civil War
1974 deaths
Military personnel killed in action
1945 births
Aviators killed by being shot down
Recipients of the Distinguished Flying Cross (United States)